Jakob Karweyse (also Karweysse; fl. 1492) was a goldsmith in Marienburg (Malbork) in the Kingdom of Poland. He is considered to have been the first Prussian printer.

Karweyse, who was probably a native, became in 1476 citizen of Marienburg. In 1492 he printed Johannes of Marienwerder's book Leben der zeligen vrouwen Dorothea, which described the life of Saint Dorothea von Montau.

Works 
 Johannes von Marienwerder: Leben der seligen Dorothea. Marienburg: Jakob Karweysse, 1492. 8° IBP 3173. Borm: IG 1781.  (M14326)
 Johannes von Marienwerder: Leben der seligen Dorothea. [Marienburg: Jakob Karweysse, um 1492]. 4° (GW M14327)
 Ein Passienbüchlein von den vier Hauptjungfrauen. [Marienburg: Jakob Karweysse]. 8°, IBP 4167. (GW M29578)

See also 
 Incunabula
 Johannes Gutenberg
 Movable type
 Printing
 Spread of the printing press

References 

15th-century German businesspeople
German printers
Printers of incunabula
People from Malbork
People from Royal Prussia
German goldsmiths
Year of death unknown
Year of birth unknown